Gediz University was a private university located in the Seyrek neighborhood of Menemen, a metropolitan district of Izmir, Turkey. It was established in 2008. On 23 July 2016, in the course of the 2016 Turkish purges, the university was closed by the Turkish government due to its alleged ties with the Gülen movement.

References

External links
  

Universities and colleges in İzmir
2008 establishments in Turkey
Educational institutions established in 2008
Private universities and colleges in Turkey
Educational institutions shut down in the 2016 Turkish purges
Defunct universities and colleges in Turkey